Compilation (also known as Caustic Window Compilation) is an album released by Richard D. James under the pseudonym Caustic Window. The album consists of most of the tracks from the EPs Joyrex J4 EP, Joyrex J5 EP, Joyrex J9i and Joyrex J9ii.

Notes 

 "AFX 114" has the same drum rhythm as "Phlange Phace", which can be found on Aphex Twin's early Xylem Tube EP and the Classics compilation.
 "Fantasia" allegedly contains samples from the same pornographic film that was sampled for "Come on You Slags!" from James' ...I Care Because You Do album.
 "Italic Eyeball" samples Julie Andrews as Maria von Trapp in The Sound of Music as she sings "Perhaps I had a wicked childhood" (forwards and in reverse)
 "Humanoid Must Not Escape" features distorted samples from the David Bowie film The Man Who Fell to Earth (the "Let's fuck!" and "Yeah yeah!") and the arcade game Berzerk.
 "We Are the Music Makers (Hardcore Mix)" samples Gene Wilder from the 1971 film Willy Wonka & the Chocolate Factory.
 "The Garden of Linmiri" was featured in a Gerard de Thame-directed television advertisement for Pirelli's P6000 tyres featuring Carl Lewis. It previously appeared on the 1993 Disco B Energy '93 compilation.

Track listing
All songs written and composed by Richard D. James.

See also 
 Richard D. James discography

References

External links
 Caustic Window – Compilation at Discogs

Aphex Twin compilation albums
1998 compilation albums
Rephlex Records compilation albums